The Dugazon family (after their stage name) or the Gourgaud family was a famous acting dynasty in 18th century France.  It was founded by Pierre-Antoine Gourgaud (1706-1774), whose children included the actors Françoise-Rose Gourgaud (1743-1804) and Jean-Henri Gourgaud (1746-1809).  It also includes members of the family by marriage, such as Jean-Henri's wife Louise-Rosalie Lefebvre (1755-1821), a mezzo-soprano opera singer who used the stage name Madame Dugazon after her marriage.  Via Françoise-Rose's marriage to Angiolo Vestris, it also became linked to the Vestris family.

Others :
 Gaspard Gourgaud

Dugazon
French families
18th-century French male actors
18th-century French actresses
French stage actresses
19th-century French male actors
French male stage actors
19th-century French actresses